Call Me by Your Name is a 2007 coming-of-age novel by American writer André Aciman that centers on a blossoming romantic relationship between an intellectually precocious, curious, and pretentious 17-year-old American-Italian Jewish boy named Elio Perlman and a visiting 24-year-old American Jewish scholar named Oliver in 1980s Italy. The novel chronicles their summer romance and the 20 years that follow. A sequel to the novel, Find Me, was released in October 2019.

Plot summary
The narrator, Elio Perlman, recalls the events of the summer of about 1983, when he was seventeen and living with his parents in Italy. Each summer, his parents would take in a doctoral student as a house guest for six weeks, who would revise a book manuscript while assisting his father with academic paperwork. Elio resents the tradition, as it requires him to vacate his bedroom so the guest can use it for the duration of their stay.

Oliver, the guest for the summer, is carefree and detached—a stark contrast to Elio's introversion. Elio selected Oliver as a guest in the hopes of "instant affinities" between them and acts as his tour guide, though Elio's attempts to impress Oliver are met with indifference.  Though Elio recognizes his own bisexuality and his attraction to Oliver—he is particularly excited by his discovery that Oliver is Jewish, seeing it as a bond between them—he doubts that Oliver reciprocates his feelings. 

One day, Elio confesses his attraction to Oliver, and they kiss on a berm where Claude Monet had supposedly painted some of his pictures. When Elio makes an advancement onto him, he rejects him.

Oliver and Elio grow distant in the subsequent days. Elio begins an affair with Marzia, a local girl around his own age that was madly in love with him. After going days without speaking, seeking reconciliation, Oliver slips a note under Elio’s bedroom door, with a plan to meet at midnight. Elio feels guilty about the encounter and decides that he cannot continue his relationship with Oliver.

The next morning, after some flirtatious interactions, Elio realizes that his attraction to Oliver persists, and that he wishes to continue their relationship. 

Before returning to the United States, Oliver decides to spend three days in Rome, where he is accompanied by Elio. The two roam the streets, drinking and falling more in love despite the upcoming dreaded moment of Oliver leaving. Elio is extremely heart broken and upon returning from the trip, he is saddened to find that his belongings have already been returned to his original bedroom that was once filled with Olivers things, and that all traces of his short visit have vanished. Clearly distressed, Elio has a discussion with his father about the twos "friendship." His father is very supportive and understanding, claiming he wishes he had experienced such a thing in his lifetime. He fully approves of the friendship (and relationship) between Elio and Oliver.

That Christmas, Oliver again visits the Perlman family, and announces that he intends to marry next summer. Oliver and Elio fall out of touch, and do not communicate with each other for many years.

Fifteen years later, Elio visits Oliver in the United States, where Oliver is now a professor. Elio is unwilling to meet Oliver's wife and children, admitting that he still feels attraction towards Oliver and jealousy towards his new family. Oliver admits that he has followed Elio's academic career, and shows him a postcard that he brought with him when he left Italy and has kept over the years. During a final meeting at a bar, Elio and Oliver muse that people can lead two parallel lives—one in reality, and one a fantasy that is denied to them by external forces.

Twenty years after their first meeting and one year before the narrator's present, Oliver visits Elio's family home in Italy. They recall their time together; Elio informs Oliver that his father has died, and that he has spread his ashes all over the world.

Reception

Reviews
Call Me by Your Name received widespread acclaim from literary critics, with review aggregator Book Marks reporting zero negative and zero mixed reviews among 10 total, indicating "rave" reviews.

Reviewing for The New York Times, Stacey D'Erasmo called the novel "an exceptionally beautiful book". Writing in The New Yorker, Cynthia Zarin said, "Aciman’s first novel shows him to be an acute grammarian of desire". In The Washington Post, Charles Kaiser said, "If you have ever been the willing victim of obsessive love—a force greater than yourself that pulls you inextricably toward the object of your desire—you will recognize every nuance of André Aciman's superb new novel, Call Me by Your Name."

Sales

According to Nielsen BookScan, the book has sold 33,376 copies for £252,675 in the United Kingdom. In early November 2017, the book went from 618 copies sold to 1,164, an 88% jump in volume week on week. It reached 2,012 copies sold for the week ending February 3.

Awards
At the 20th Lambda Literary Awards, the novel won the award for Gay Fiction.

Media

Film adaptation

A film adaptation directed by Luca Guadagnino and starring Timothée Chalamet as Elio, Armie Hammer as Oliver, and Michael Stuhlbarg as Elio's father was released on November 24, 2017, in the United States to critical acclaim. At the 90th Academy Awards, it was nominated for Best Picture, Best Actor (Chalamet), Best Original Song ("Mystery of Love" by Sufjan Stevens), and Best Adapted Screenplay (James Ivory), winning the latter.

Audiobook
An audiobook narrated by Armie Hammer was published in 2017 by Macmillan Publishers.

Sequel

On December 3, 2018, Aciman announced on his Twitter account that he was writing a sequel to Call Me by Your Name. On March 20, 2019, Aciman announced the sequel's title, Find Me. It was published by Farrar, Straus and Giroux on October 29, 2019.

See also

List of fiction works made into feature films (0–9, A–C)

References

External links 

2007 American novels
American bildungsromans
American erotic novels
American LGBT novels
American novels adapted into films
Jews and Judaism in fiction
Lambda Literary Award-winning works
Novels set in Italy
Novels with gay themes
Novels with bisexual themes
Male bisexuality in fiction
Bisexuality-related fiction
Novels set in the 1980s
2000s LGBT novels
Call Me by Your Name
2007 LGBT-related literary works